Krege is a German surname. Notable people with the surname include:

 Sandra Krege (born 1987), German chess master
 Wolfgang Krege (1939–2005), German author and translator

German-language surnames